Madukkur block is a revenue block in the Pattukkottai taluk of Thanjavur district, Tamil Nadu, India. There are a total of 33 villages in this block.

List of Panchayat Villages

References 

 

Revenue blocks of Thanjavur district